Donald John may refer to:
 Donald John Trump
 Donald John Trump, Jr.
 Donald John Markwell
 Donald John McGillivray
 Donald John Wiseman
 Donald John Smith
 Donald John May
 Donald John Tyson
 Donald John Allan
 Donald John Roberts
 Donald John Deacon
 Donald John Bowman
 Donald John Dean
 Donald John Cameron
 Huan Donald John Fraser
 Donald John Lewis
 Donald John Logan Bennet
 Donald John Lee
 Donald John Pinkava
 Donald John Bacon
 Donald John Bacon (baseball)
 Donald John Stott

See also 
 Don John (disambiguation)
 John Donald (disambiguation)